Arcidiacono is an Italian surname. Notable people with the name include:

 Angelo Arcidiacono (1955–2007), Italian fencer
 Giuseppe Arcidiacono (1927–1998), Italian physicist
 Ryan Arcidiacono (born 1994),  American basketball player

Italian-language surnames